Daxin is a town under the administration of Dawu County, Hubei, China. , it administers Daxin Residential Neighborhood and the following 23 villages:
Daxin Village
Shidun Village
Shencheng Village
Shanghe Village
Changshan Village
Sugu Village
Yufan Village
Tangfan Village
Xinhe Village
Taoyuan Village
Jiangshan Village
Yaohe Village
Yaotang Village
Tuqiao Village
Xiangyang Village
Wutong Village
Heping Village
Jiugang Village
Louwan Village
Jianxin Village
Bakoutang Village
Xinqiao Village
Shangchong Village

References 

Township-level divisions of Hubei
Dawu County, Hubei